FH JOANNEUM is one of the biggest colleges of higher education in Austria. It has about 5,000 students and about 750 employees. The main campus is located in Graz and there are two additional locations in Kapfenberg and Bad Gleichenberg. All three are situated in the province Styria in Austria. FH JOANNEUM offers almost 70 degree programs in a variety of areas including business, technology, design, media, architecture, health and social services. The programmes are practice-oriented, project-based and interdisciplinary.

History 

FH JOANNEUM was established in 1995. In 2001 the campus in Bad Gleichenberg started to offer health related degree programmes.

Gallery

Departments/ programmes 
The FH JOANNEUM offers almost 70 bachelor's and master's degree programs and postgraduate courses at six departments and 26 institutes. The six departments are:
 Applied computer science
 Engineering
 Health studies
 Building, Energy & Society
 Media & Design
 Management
In addition to broad-based programs, there are courses with specialized focus, such as "Energy, Transport and Environmental Management", "eHealth" or "Advanced Electronic Engineering". Some new programs cover fields which have not yet been offered in Austria as university studies, for example, the midwifery education.

Projects 
 One of the largest projects with students participation is the "joanneum racing team". Every year, the students in "Automotive Engineering", "Industrial Design", "Information Design", "Electronics & Technology Management", "Production Technology and Organisation", "Journalism & Public Relations" and "Physiotherapy" construct, build and commercialize a car. The project is based in the course "automotive engineering" and is supported by sponsors. The car is then taken to the "Formula Student" part and other Formula SAE competitions.  The greatest successes are the overall win at the 2006 Formula SAE Italy and the 3rd overall rankings 2007 in Hockenheim and at the Formula Student UK 2008 at Silverstone.
 Another student project is the magazine "blank" and its companion web site that are created each year by students of "Journalism and PR". For other media productions, cameras, audio recorders, tripods and microphones can be hired.
 The participants of the courses "Luftfahrt / Aviation", "Information Design", "Industrial Design" and "Vehicle Technology" are also involved in projects in "Green Mobility". In practical projects they contribute new ideas and developments. They are supported by companies in the automotive industry. The development of a drone (UAVS) for civilian operations fall within the scope Green Mobility.

Research

Training priorities, certifications and laboratories 
 OS Education: MS IT Academy
 Electronic Design Center: Digital Short Range Radio, Embedded Systems, DSP
 Competence node telematics Kapfenberg
 Competence Center for Health Reporting
 Network Education: Cisco Networking Academy
 Seminars and workshops for managers (Summer Business School)
 Health Perception Lab (HPL) - Laboratory for Health and Sensors
 Entology Net: Force Lab - Showroom and explanation Forum for IT applications
 Perceptual laboratory VisionSpace: 3D visualization, technology-supported learning and human-computer interaction
 Metabolomics Laboratory: analysis methods in biomedical research
 Sports Science Laboratory "SpoWiLab"
 Laboratory of Avionics and ATC Technology
 Laboratory of Flight Simulation
 Laboratory of Physics and facade technology
 Laboratory for High-Frequency and Electromagnetic Compatibility
 Automotive Engineering test laboratory (accreditation body in accordance with ÖVE / ÖNORM EN ISO / IEC 17025)
 Streaming Studio: Web Radio Studio
 eGovernment Service Lab: Unlocks the Citizen Card and mobile signature
 Web Literacy Lab

International 
The Department of International Relations takes care of all exchange students from the university (for study or internship) going abroad (outgoings) and from abroad coming to the university (incomings). It acts as a contact point for partner universities. The department also organizes German courses (as a foreign language) and holds events and excursions.

FH JOANNEUM has approximately 200 partner universities in Europe, Asia, South America, North America and Australia / New Zealand.

Student union 
ÖH joanneum is the student union (ÖH) of FH JOANNEUM. It exists since the winter semester 2005/2006 and has since become an integrated part of the Teaching Board. By anchoring the FH student representatives in the Austrian Students' system, ÖH joanneum has become a legally established body. The activities of ÖH joanneum include representing the interests of FH JOANNEUM students at a higher level (e.g. As in the Federal Representation of Students' Union). Since autumn 2010 ÖH joanneum is also working on the magazine "JOE", educational issues and the organization of studies and the student life at home and abroad. The first edition was published in January 2011.

References

External links
FH JOANNEUM

Universities of Applied Sciences in Austria
Educational institutions established in 1995
1995 establishments in Austria